Run is a 2020 Indian Telugu-language psychological thriller film directed by Lakshmikanth Chenna, starring Navdeep and Pujita Ponnada. Produced by Y. Rajeev Reddy and Sai Baba Jagarlamudi under First Frame Entertainments banner, the film was released on Aha on 29 May 2020. The film is reported to be the first Telugu direct-to-OTT release although Amrutharamam premiered a month earlier.

Plot 
Shruthi and Sandeep are a couple. They arrange for a lunch date on their anniversary, but they never meet because Shruthi has died unexpectedly. Sandeep becomes a suspect in her mysterious death.

Cast 
 Navdeep as Sandeep Reddy
 Pujita Ponnada as Shruthi
 Amit Tiwari as Khaleel
 Bhanu Sri as Rosy
 Mukhtar Khan as Shankar Reddy
 Kausalya as Imaginary Doctor
 Shafi as Real Doctor
 Hari Chandra as Babai
 Kireeti as Rahul
 Venkat as Bharath
 Gautham Bhavaraju as Sunil
 Harsha Sai as a police officer

Production 
Run was originally intended to be a web series for Aha. It was planned as an 8-episode series with each episode spanning 20 minutes. However Allu Aravind, who is a part of Aha's team, believed that Run should be an original feature film.

Principal photography took place for 24 days, between October and November 2019.

Release 
The film was released directly on the OTT platform Aha, on 29 May 2020.

Reception 
Sangeetha Devi Dundoo of The Hindu, called the film "A lacklustre psychological thriller." While praising Navdeep's performance, Dundoo stated that the screenplay was predictable and could have been better executed. The Times of India gave the film one-and-a-half stars out of five and heavily criticized the film for its incoherent script and a poorly-written screenplay. Pratyush Parasaraman writing for the Film Companion, also gave a negative review for the film.

References

External links 
 

2020 psychological thriller films
Indian psychological thriller films
Films set in Hyderabad, India
Direct-to-video thriller films
2020 direct-to-video films
2020s Telugu-language films
Aha (streaming service) original films